AMCA may refer to:
 A Man Called Adam (group)
 Advanced Medium Combat Aircraft
 Air Movement and Control Association
 Amateur Motorcycling Association
 American Mosquito Control Association
 Antique Motorcycle Club of America
 Arkansas Medical Cannabis Act